Meharia avicenna is a moth in the family Cossidae. It is found in Iran.

References

Moths described in 2011
Meharia
Moths of the Middle East